Christopher Joseph Burke (born August 26, 1965) is an American actor. He has become best known for his character Charles "Corky" Thatcher on the television series Life Goes On.

Early years 
Burke is the youngest of four children of Marian Burke, a retired trade-show manager, and Frank Burke, a retired NYPD inspector. Burke was born with Down syndrome at a time when little was known about the disorder, and his parents were told to institutionalize him. Instead, they decided to raise him at home and nurture his talents with the help of his siblings. From a young age, Burke enjoyed watching TV and movies and wanted to be on television. He was encouraged by his supportive family to follow his career objectives no matter how unconventional they seemed, especially for a young man with Down syndrome.

In the early 1970s, American public schools were not yet mainstreaming students with disabilities into general education classes. Burke attended the Kennedy Child Study Center in New York City, from age five until graduating shortly before his eighth birthday. At that time there were no suitable private education programs for students with disabilities in the area, so, in the fall of 1973, Burke was sent to board at the Cardinal Cushing School and Training Center in Hanover, Massachusetts. In 1978, Burke transferred to the Don Guanella School in Springfield, Pennsylvania, to be closer to his brother, J.R., who lived close by. Burke graduated from Don Guanella in 1986. After graduation, he worked as an elevator operator and did volunteer work for programs for students with disabilities at New York City's Public School 138.

Burke's first acting performance was in a production of "The Emperor's New Clothes" at the Cardinal Cushing School. His dramatic reading made quite an impression on the audience as well as Hollywood producer Robert Evans, who happened to be in the theatre at the time. This role inspired him to participate in a talent show after he transferred to Don Guanella, in which he acted as a zombie in a reenactment of Michael Jackson's "Thriller" video. He continued to hone his talent by attending night classes, going to auditions, writing scripts, and voraciously reading books about his favorite actors.

Acting

Early acting roles and Life Goes On 
Burke got his first professional acting job in 1987 in the ABC TV movie Desperate. Network executives at ABC were impressed by his performance in Desperate and created Life Goes On with Burke's character, Charles "Corky" Thatcher, as the main role. Corky was the first character in a network television series with Down syndrome. Burke's revolutionary role conveyed a realistic portrayal of people with Down syndrome and changed the way audiences viewed people with disabilities. Life Goes On propelled Burke into fame and wide recognition. The series ran from 1989 to 1993.

Later acting roles 
Since Life Goes On, Burke has made appearances on numerous TV shows and movies, most notably co-starring with JoBeth Williams in the NBC Movie of the Week Jonathan: The Boy Nobody Wanted.

Some of his TV show and movie appearances include:
 
Jonathan: The Boy Nobody Wanted, TV movie, 1992
North and South, Book III: Heaven & Hell, miniseries, 1994
The Commish TV series, 1994
Promised Land TV series, 1997
Touched by an Angel recurring as Taylor, an angel who has Down syndrome, 1997
The Division, 2002
ER, 2002

Awards 
Golden Globe Award Nominee, Best Actor in a Supporting Role in a Series, Mini-Series or Motion Picture Made for TV, 1990
Golden Apple Awards Nominee, 1990
Ten Outstanding Young Americans, 1991
National Rehabilitation Hospital Honoree, 1993
Just One Break (JOB) Ability First Award, 1995
Hall of Honor, AHRC, 1999

Down syndrome advocacy 
Burke has been the Goodwill Ambassador for the National Down Syndrome Society since 1994. He has starred in the organization's acclaimed public service announcements, including Tracey Ullman in 1999 and, more recently, for the My Great Story public awareness campaign with actor John C. McGinley and TV Hosts Meredith Vieira and Nancy O'Dell. As a Goodwill Ambassador, he travels the country attending Buddy Walks, making public appearances, speaking with the press and greeting fans. When he is not on the road, Burke is a valued member of the National Down Syndrome Society's staff, working in their New York City office.

Burke has delivered inspirational speeches around the world and continues to speak at schools, seminars, conferences and non-profit organizations. He also tours the U.S. with his three piece musical group, "Chris Burke with Joe and John DeMasi", for which he is the singer. Burke met his bandmates, twin brothers Joe and John DeMasi, when they were music counselors at the town of Hempstead, New York's ANCHOR program for individuals with disabilities, when Burke was a teenager. The group has released four albums. Lollipops and Love Songs was released in 1993. In 1994, they signed a record deal with BMGKidz and released Singer with the Band. This was followed up by the release of Forever Friends, which won a Parents Choice Gold Seal for Excellence Award, and A World of Kindness in 1998. They also have produced a two-episode DVD for children called The Forever Friends Show and have appeared on television performing their signature song, "Celebrate."

In 1991, Burke co-wrote his autobiography, A Special Kind of Hero, with Jo Beth McDaniel. From 1994 to 2005, he was the editor-in-chief of "News 'n Views" and "UpBeat", publications written by and for people with Down syndrome, and in 2009, he contributed to the National Down Syndrome Society's My Great Story campaign by writing his story, "Great Expectations".

References

External links 
 Chris Burke Official Site
 
 National Down Syndrome Society 
 Buddy Walk 
 My Great Story 
 The Ambassadors
 Skiff News

1965 births
Living people
Actors with Down syndrome
American male television actors
People from Point Lookout, New York
Male actors from New York (state)